St Ambrose Church is a Roman Catholic church in Brunswick, Victoria, a suburb of Melbourne, Australia.

Location
The church building is located at 287 on Sydney Road, one of the main roads in the Northern suburb of Brunswick in Melbourne.

History
In the second half of the 19th century, the land where the church building now stands belonged to Mr. Michael Dawson of Brunswick. However, in 1860, it was also used as a camp for nomadic Aboriginals.

In the late 1860s, Dawson donated the land to the Catholic Church for a new church to be built in the neighbourhood. Prior to this, Catholics who lived in Brunswick had to go to Coburg, North of Brunswick, or to the Melbourne City Centre, South of Brunswick. The church was named in honour of Saint Ambrose (340–397), who served as the Archbishop of Milan in Italy in the fourth century AD, after an Italian family from Milan who lived in Brunswick suggested it.

The first foundation stone was laid in 1869, with 800 Catholics in attendance. After spending £6,000, the building was completed in 1873.

In 1890, it became a parish church, cut off from the Coburg parish. Nine years later, in 1899, the church building was extended, with additional transepts, a sanctuary, two chapels, a porch and a baptistry. On 19 February 1899 a memorial stone was also added near the Northern transept.

During the First World War, it was a meeting place for the anti-conscription movement.

The church building was restored in 2000.

Heritage significance
The church building was designed in the Gothic Revival architectural style, with a cruciform plan. The wall are made of bluestone, and the roof is made of timber. There is also an organ dating back to the nineteenth century, and stained glass windows.

It has been listed by Heritage Victoria with a "Heritage Overlay," which aims to protect places of local significance to Victoria.

References

Roman Catholic churches in Melbourne
Roman Catholic churches in Victoria (Australia)
Roman Catholic churches completed in 1873
Gothic Revival architecture in Melbourne
Heritage-listed buildings in Melbourne
Gothic Revival church buildings in Australia
19th-century Roman Catholic church buildings in Australia
Buildings and structures in the City of Merri-bek
1873 establishments in Australia